Rumpt is a village in the Betuwe region in the Netherlands. It is a part of the municipality of West Betuwe, and is situated about halfway between Utrecht and Den Bosch, on the Linge river.

History
Rumpt was first mentioned as Rumpst around the year 960 in a document listing the possessions of St. Martin's Church in Utrecht. Other names used for the village and the surrounding areas in historical documents were Rumede, Romde en Rumt. A stretched out esdorp developed along the Linge. The tower of the Dutch Reformed Church dates from around 1300. The church was built 15th century. The Catholic Church was built from 1851 to 1852 in neo-gothic style. 

In 1840, Rumpt was home to 658 people. The name was officially changed to Rumt in 1883, because the "p" is silent. The name change was undone in the early-20th century.

Gallery

References

Populated places in Gelderland
West Betuwe